Sarab-e Ganj Ali and Sarab-e Ganj'ali and Sarab Ganjali may refer to:

Sarab-e Ganj Ali, Khorramabad
Sarab-e Ganj Ali, Pol-e Dokhtar